Alonso Adrián Juárez Jiménez (born 6 February 1978) is a Mexican politician affiliated with the National Action Party. As of 2014 he served as Deputy of the LIX Legislature of the Mexican Congress representing the State of Mexico as replacement of Rubén Mendoza Ayala.

References

1978 births
Living people
Politicians from the State of Mexico
National Action Party (Mexico) politicians
Deputies of the LIX Legislature of Mexico
Members of the Chamber of Deputies (Mexico) for the State of Mexico